The Western Championships also known as the Western States Championships or Western Sectional Championships was a men's and women's open tennis tournament staged annually at various locations from 1887 until 1978.

History
On July 4, 1887, the first Championships of the Western States were inaugurated at the Scarlett Ribbon Club in Chicago, Illinois, United States, and the first men's champion was Charles Amherst Chase. In 1895 a women's championship event was added to the schedule which was won by Marion Capwell

In 1973 the final ladies championship was held that was won by the Australian player Evonne Goolagong. The mens tournament continued to play until 1978 which was won by the American player Eddie Dibbs.

The championships were part of the USLTA Circuit from 1887 until 1924. It became of part of the ILTF Circuit following the United States joining the International Lawn Tennis Federation in 1925 until 1969 In 1970 the tournament became part of the ILTF Grand Prix Circuit. In 1952 and from 1969 until 1973 the women's event was also valid as the Tri-State Championships.

Locations
The championships have been played in the following cities; Chicago, Cincinnati, Harbor Springs, Indianapolis, Kansas City, Lake Forest, Minnetonka, Neenah, River Forest and Sharonville.

References

Defunct tennis tournaments in the United States